Nguyễn Trung Đại Dương, also known as Suleiman Oladoja Abdullahi (born February 9, 1986 in Nigeria), is a Vietnamese Nigerian who plays as a forward for V.League 1 club Công An Hà Nội.

Honours
Công An Nhân Dân
V.League 2: 2022

References

External links 

1986 births
Living people
Category Nigerian Muslims
Nigerian footballers
Vietnamese footballers
Association football forwards
Saigon FC players
Becamex Binh Duong FC players
Quang Nam FC players
V.League 1 players
Expatriate footballers in Vietnam
Nigerian expatriate sportspeople in Vietnam
Naturalized citizens of Vietnam
Vietnamese people of Nigerian descent